S'chach is the Hebrew name for the material used as a roof for a sukkah, used on the Jewish holiday of Sukkot.

S'chach has to derive from things that have "grown from the ground", such as palm leaves, bamboo sticks and pine tree branches. Some types of wooden slats and other types of organic material can be used for s'chach, unless they were processed for a different use. The s'chach must have been disconnected from the ground so, for example, placing a sukkah under the boughs of a tree would render it not valid. As a minimum, the s'chach must be thick enough that it provides more shade than light in the sukkah. As a maximum, there is a concept of being able to see the stars through the s'chach, but the absolute maximum is that rain should be able to penetrate into the sukkah.
If the sukkah is kept year round, the s'chach must be replaced no more than 30 days before Sukkos. It is not necessary to completely remove the s'chach; it would be sufficient to lift each piece of s'chach up one foot or more into the air, and then put it back down.

References

Hebrew words and phrases
Trees in religion
Sukkot

Hebrew words and phrases in Jewish law